This a list of the members of the Metropolitan Board of Works, London, 1855-1889.

Members of the board were not elected by the general public, but were chosen by the City of London Corporation and by the Vestries and District Boards of the Metropolis from among their members.

The first members were elected in December 1855, coming into office in January 1856. From May 1857 one third of the board retired annually, the seats becoming vacant being chosen by ballot. Where casual vacancies occurred these were filled for the remainder of the term these are annotated and explained in the adjoining column..

Over 1885–86 the membership was enlarged: 11 members were added for populous parts of the city.  A further Battersea-specific member was added in 1888.  These additions are table-coloured lime green.

The board also had a salaried chairman:
 John Thwaites (elected by Greenwich and St Saviours Districts in 1855. Resigned both seats on becoming chairman 22 December 1855.) He was knighted in 1865.
 James Hogg, who had been elected to represent St George Hanover square, succeeded Thwaites on 18 November 1870. He assumed the surname of McGarel Hogg in 1877 and was created Baron Magheramorne in 1887.

References
		

History of local government in London (1855–1889)
Metropolitan Board of Works